Udyog Aadhaar is a twelve digit Unique Identification Number provided by the Indian Ministry of Micro, Small and Medium Enterprises beginning in September 2015. It is also known as Aadhaar for business. As of July 2018, more than 4.8 million (48 lakh) MSMEs in India are registered under Udyog Aadhaar.

Benefits 

 Eligibility for participation in the India International Trade Fair.
 Stamp duties and registration fees waived.
 Barcode registration subsidy.
 15% subsidy under CLCSS technology scheme.
 Preference and exemptions when applying for government tenders.
 Concessional electricity bills.
 Reimbursements for ISO certification.
 1% exemption on OD (overdraft loan) interest.
 Optimal loan limit increased to Rs. 5 million (50 lakh).
 Guarantee cover increased from 75% to 80%.
 Reservation of products for manufacturing by MSMEs/SSIs.
 Eligibility for IPS subsidy.
 Excise Exemption scheme.
 50% subsidy for patent registration.

Documents Required for Udyog Aadhaar 

 Aadhaar card or Aadhaar Enrolment ID slip
 Bank passbook with photograph
 Voter ID card
 Passport
 PAN card
 Driving license
 An employee ID card issued by the Government (if any)
 Caste certificate (for SC, ST, and OBC category)

Criticisms 
Companies registered under Udyog Aadhaar are often noted for their poor productivity; both capital and labour productivity per unit of output are low compared to bigger firms. This indicates that Udyog Aadhaar has failed to augment technological adoption for MSMEs.

See also 
 Aadhaar
 Ministry of Micro, Small and Medium Enterprises

References

External links 
 Official website
 Udyog Aadhar booklet

Identity documents of India
Ministry of Micro, Small and Medium Enterprises
Small-scale industry in India
National identification numbers
Modi administration initiatives
2015 establishments in India